In order theory, the Szpilrajn extension theorem (also called the order-extension principle), proved by Edward Szpilrajn in 1930, states that every partial order is contained in a total order. Intuitively, the theorem says that any method of comparing elements that leaves some pairs incomparable can be extended in such a way that every pair becomes comparable. The theorem is one of many examples of the use of the axiom of choice in the form of Zorn's lemma to find a maximal set with certain properties.

Definitions and statement 

A relation is reflexive if  holds for every element  it is transitive if  imply  for all  it is antisymmetric if  imply  for all  and it is a connex relation if  holds for all  A partial order is, by definition, a reflexive, transitive and antisymmetric relation. A total order is a partial order that is connex.

A relation  is contained in another relation  when all ordered pairs in  also appear in  that is, implies  for all  The extension theorem states that every relation  that is reflexive, transitive and antisymmetric (that is, a partial order) is contained in another relation  which is reflexive, transitive, antisymmetric and connex (that is, a total order).

Proof 

The theorem is proved in two steps. First, if a partial order does not compare  and  it can be extended by first adding the pair  and then performing the transitive closure, and second, since this operation generates an ordering that strictly contains the original one and can be applied to all pairs of incomparable elements, there exists a relation in which all pairs of elements have been made comparable.

Next it is shown that the poset of partial orders containing  ordered by inclusion, has a maximal element. The existence of such a maximal element is proved by applying Zorn's lemma to this poset. A chain in this poset is a set of relations containing  such that given any two of these relations, one is contained in the other.

To apply Zorn's lemma, it must be shown that every chain has an upper bound in the poset.

Therefore by Zorn's lemma the set of partial orders containing  has a maximal element  and it remains only to show that  is total. Indeed if  had a pair of incomparable elements then it is possible to apply the process of the first step to it, leading to another strict partial order that contains  and strictly contains  contradicting that  is maximal.  is therefore a total order containing  completing the proof.

Other extension theorems 

Arrow stated that every preorder (reflexive and transitive relation) can be extended to a total preorder (transitive and connex relation). This claim was later proved by Hansson.

See also

References

Articles containing proofs
Axiom of choice
Order theory
Theorems in the foundations of mathematics